"Terrence Loves You" is a song recorded by American singer and songwriter Lana Del Rey for her album Honeymoon (2015). It was released as the album's first promotional single on August 21, 2015. Written by Del Rey and Rick Nowels, the song has been described as "hypnotic", with Del Rey singing over piano, strings, and a "moaning" saxophone. The song contains an interpolation of the song "Space Oddity" by English singer-songwriter David Bowie from his eponymous second studio album. Del Rey stated that the song is her favorite from Honeymoon, describing it as "jazzy".

Background and release
The song premiered via Del Rey's "Honeymoon Hotline", a hotline set up for fans to receive updates on the album direct from Del Rey herself, as well as have access to other content, such as lectures.  On August 21, 2015, the official audio was uploaded to Del Rey's Vevo channel. The same day, "Terrence Loves You" was made available in digital download.

Composition
"Terrence Loves You" is a lounge ballad. It has been described as "hypnotic", with Del Rey singing over piano, strings, and a "moaning" saxophone. The song contains an interpolation of the song "Space Oddity" by English singer-songwriter David Bowie from his eponymous second studio album.
The song opens with isolated guitar notes plucked and dropped, before moving into the distance as piano chords appear, followed by violins, and, Del Rey's vocals. The chorus is delivered in an operatic style and lyrically talks about strength in the face of abandonment. Throughout the chorus, there are brief saxophone sections inserted and Bowie references with lyrics such as "Ground control to Major Tom/ Can you hear me all night long?".

Critical reception
Rolling Stone called the song "hypnotic" and praised Del Rey's vocal performance.

Charts

References

2010s ballads
2015 singles
2015 songs
Interscope Records singles
Lana Del Rey songs
Lounge music
Major Tom
Polydor Records singles
Songs written by Lana Del Rey
Songs written by Rick Nowels